2001 Uganda Cup was the 27th season of the main Ugandan football Cup.

Overview
The competition was known as the Kakungulu Cup and was won by Express Red Eagles who defeated SC Villa 5-3 on penalties in the final. The score was level at 1-1 at the end of extra time. The results available for the earlier rounds are incomplete.

Quarter-finals
The 4 matches in this round were played between 7 October and 8 November 2001.

Semi-finals
The semi-finals were played on 10 and 11 November 2001.

Final
The final was played on 14 November 2001.

Footnotes

External links
 Uganda - List of Cup Finals - RSSSF (Mikael Jönsson, Ian King and Hans Schöggl)

Ugandan Cup
Uganda Cup
Cup